1856 in archaeology

Explorations

Excavations

Finds
 First remains of Neanderthal Man found in the Neandertal Valley of Germany.

Publications

Births
 28 September: Edward Herbert Thompson, Mayanist

Deaths

See also
 List of years in archaeology
 1855 in archaeology
 1857 in archaeology

References

Archaeology
Archaeology by year
Archaeology
Archaeology